Walter Goldbeck (12 February 1945 – 2 July 2022) was a German politician. A member of the Free Democratic Party, he served in the Landtag of Mecklenburg-Vorpommern from 1990 to 1994.

Goldbeck died in July 2022 at the age of 77.

References

1945 births
2022 deaths
Free Democratic Party (Germany) politicians
20th-century German politicians
Members of the Landtag of Mecklenburg-Western Pomerania
University of Erfurt alumni
German educators
People from Prignitz